William Alberto López García (24 September 1978 – 20 June 2005) was a Salvadoran footballer.

Club career
López played for Salvadoran premier division sides Arcense and Alianza.

International career
López made his debut for El Salvador in a January 2004 friendly match against Panama in which he started but was substituted after only 8 minutes. It proved to be his sole international match.

Death
On 20 June 2005, López was attacked in Quezaltepeque by gang members and shot in the abdomen. He died in an ambulance while being rushed to a nearby hospital. Family held members of the Mara Salvatrucha gang responsible for the attack. López was survived by his wife, Rosario del Carmen Pacheco and sons William and Cristian. He was buried in Quezaltepeque on 23 June 2005.

In October 2005, a juvenile was sentenced to 7 years in detention and other suspects of the murder were still awaiting their trial. Later, Jesús Membreño was sentenced to 40 years in prison for the murder on López.

References

External links
 Un digno homenaje para William López (Tribute) - El Diario de Hoy 
 López se fue al cielo - El Diario de Hoy 

1978 births
2005 deaths
Association football forwards
Salvadoran footballers
El Salvador international footballers
Alianza F.C. footballers
Male murder victims
Salvadoran murder victims
People murdered in El Salvador
Deaths by firearm in El Salvador
Place of birth missing
2005 crimes in El Salvador
2005 murders in North America
2000s murders in El Salvador

ar:ويليام أنطونيو توريس